Cause for Alarm may refer to:

 Cause for Alarm! (film), a 1951 film noir starring Loretta Young
 Cause for Alarm (album), a 1986 album by Agnostic Front
 Cause for Alarm (novel), a 1938 novel by Eric Ambler
 Cause for Alarm (band), a Krishnacore group

See also
 No Cause for Alarm, a 1979 album by Violinski